Jong Yong-hyok (born January 3, 1988) is a North Korean pair skater. He competed in the 2006 Winter Olympics with partner Phyo Yong-myong, with whom he teamed up in the fall of 2005. They withdrew after the short program. Jong qualified a spot for the Olympics with his previous partner Sung Mi-hyang. However, Sung was not age-eligible for the Olympics, so he switched partners for the Olympics and returned to partnering with Sung after the Olympics.

Jong has also competed with Jang Kyong-ok and Paek Mi-hyang. He is the 2004 North Korean national champion with Paek and the 2007-2009 North Korean national champion with Sung.

References 

 
 

North Korean male pair skaters
Figure skaters at the 2006 Winter Olympics
Olympic figure skaters of North Korea
Living people
1988 births
Sportspeople from Pyongyang
Figure skaters at the 2007 Asian Winter Games